The 2021 Open de Limoges was a professional tennis tournament played on indoor hard courts. It was the 14th edition of the tournament and part of the 2021 WTA 125 tournaments series, offering a total of $115,000 in prize money. It took place at the Palais des Sports de Beaublanc in Limoges, France, from 13 to 19 December 2021.

Singles entrants

Seeds 

 1 Rankings as of 6 December 2021.

Other entrants 
The following players received wildcards into the singles main draw:
  Audrey Albié
  Robin Montgomery
  Mallaurie Noël
  Alison Van Uytvanck

The following players received entry from the qualifying draw:
  Elsa Jacquemot
  Léolia Jeanjean
  Marine Partaud
  Andreea Roșca

Withdrawals
Before the tournament
  Clara Burel → replaced by  Ankita Raina
  Mihaela Buzărnescu → replaced by  Anna Blinkova
  Jaqueline Cristian → replaced by  Lucia Bronzetti
  Olga Danilović → replaced by  Tamara Korpatsch
  Océane Dodin → replaced by  Natalia Vikhlyantseva
  Anna-Lena Friedsam → replaced by  Mariam Bolkvadze
  Anhelina Kalinina → replaced by  Cristina Bucșa
  Chloé Paquet → replaced by  Iryna Shymanovich
  Dayana Yastremska → replaced by  Jessika Ponchet

Doubles entrants

Seeds 

 1 Rankings as of 6 December 2021.

Champions

Singles

  Alison Van Uytvanck def.  Ana Bogdan 6–2, 7–5

Doubles

  Monica Niculescu /  Vera Zvonareva def.  Estelle Cascino /  Jessika Ponchet 6–4, 6–4

References

External links 
 Official website 

2021 WTA 125 tournaments
2021 in French tennis
Open de Limoges
December 2021 sports events in France